Asia Commercial Co. Ltd. (ACC) was a Hong Kong-based computer company which manufactured the ACC 8000, a MOS 6502-based personal computer compatible with the Apple IIe. It could run Apple DOS 3.3, CP/M or FLEX. The ACC 8000 was built for business and professional use, and used a mechanical keyboard. It was not successful, and is today quite rare.

See also

Other Asian computer makers include:

 Acer (company)
 Lenovo

External links and references 
 Old-Computers.com — ACC 8000 PC

Defunct computer hardware companies
Electronics companies of Hong Kong
Companies with year of establishment missing
Apple II clones